Cantando Histórias is a Latin Grammy winning album by Ivan Lins. It is the first and only Brazilian and Portuguese language album to win the Latin Grammy for Album of the Year to date.

Track listing

 Abre Alas
 Guarde Nos Olhos
 Dinorah, Dinorah
 O Tempo Me Guardou Você
 Desesperar, Jamais
 Aos Nossos Filhos/Cartomante
 Bilhete
 Porta Entreaberta
 Vitoriosa
 Viesta/Iluminados
 Ai, Ai, Ai, Ai, Ai
 Começar de Novo
 O Amor É O Meu País
 Madalena

Awards

Latin Grammy Awards

The album won the following awards at the 2005 Latin Grammy Awards:

Album of the Year
Best MPB (Musica Popular Brasileira) Album

Certification

References

2004 albums
Latin Grammy Award winners for Album of the Year
Ivan Lins albums
Latin Grammy Award for Best MPB Album